Ali Jackson Jr. (born April 3, 1976) is an American drummer, musician, composer, arranger, educator, and percussionist. Son of Ali Jackson (jazz bassist). Ali Jr. started playing drums at the age of 2.

Ali’s natural ability and passion for music bloomed and by the age of 11 his aptitude flourished as a result of a steady stream of lessons and mentoring from an all-star lineup of music legends, including Max Roach, Milt Hinton, Dr. Donald Byrd, Betty Carter, Aretha Franklin and James Mtume. During one lesson when he was 12, Ali met Wynton Marsalis and impressed the trumpet virtuoso and future collaborator with his maturity and his advanced knowledge of the piano and music theory — skills rare among drummers.

Ali graduated as a music major with high honors from Detroit’s prestigious Cass Technical High School, a program with a rich legacy of consistently producing the country’s top musicians.

As a student at the New School University for Contemporary Music in New York City, he was privileged to study with Max Roach and Elvin Jones. He attended college on a full academic scholarship, earning an undergraduate degree in music composition. In 1994 Ali was selected as the guest soloist for the Beacons of Jazz program honoring legendary jazz drummer Max Roach. The Thelonious Monk Institute and Jazz Aspen selected him to participate in the first annual Jazz Aspen for gifted and talented musicians. Ali was also the first recipient of the state of Michigan’s prestigious Artserv Emerging Artist award in 1998, a program with a rich legacy of consistently producing the country’s top musicians.

Jackson is from Detroit. A reviewer for The New York Times in 2009 wrote that "Jackson generates a subtle but irresistible force when he plays, making even the smallest gestures advance his agenda of locomotion."

Personal
Ali is the father of professional soccer player Aziel Jackson.

Discography

As leader or co-leader
 Groove at Jazz en Tete (Blue Geodesics, 2000)
 Gold Sounds with James Carter, Cyrus Chestnut, Reginald Veal (Brown Brothers, 2005)
 Big Brown Get Down Vol.1 (BigWenzee Music, 2007)
 Wheelz Keep Rollin'  (BigWenzee Music, 2008)
 Yes! (2012) with Yes! Trio (Aaron Goldberg & Omer Avital)
 Amalgamations (Sunnyside, 2014)
 Groove Du Jour (2019) with Yes! Trio 
 Big Brown Get Down Vol. 2 (BigWenzee Music, 2021)

As sideman
With Buster Williams
 Joined at the Hip (2002)

With Craig Handy
Reflections in Change (Sirocco Music, 1999)
 Flow (2000)

With Lincoln Center Jazz Orchestra
 Congo Square (2007)
 Portrait in Seven Shades composed by Ted Nash (2010) Grammy Winner
 Vitoria Suite (2010)
 Wynton Marsalis and Eric Clapton Play the Blues (2011)
 Live in Cuba (2015)
 Big Band Holidays (2015)
 The Abyssinian Mass" (2016)
 The Music of John Lewis (2017)
 Handful of Keys (2017)
 Una Noche con Rubén Blades (2018)
 Big Band Holidays (2019)
 Sherman Irby's Inferno (2020)
 The Music of Wayne Shorter feat. Wayne Shorter (2020)

With Wynton Marsalis
 The Magic Hour (2004)
 From the Plantation to the Penitentiary (2007)
 Willie Nelson and Wynton Marsalis Play the Music of Ray Charles (2009)
 Two Men with Blues (2009) with Willie Nelson
 He and She (2009)
 From Billie Holiday to Edith Piaf: Live in Marciac (2010) with Richard Galliano

With Joshua Redman
Back East (2007)

With Kurt Rosenwinkel
Deep Song (2005)

With others
 Last Chance for Common Sense, Rodney Kendrick (1997)
 I Got Next, KRS-One (1997)
 Gunn Fu, Russell Gunn (1997)
 Blues for the New Millennium, Marcus Roberts (1997)
 Into the Blue, Emmanuel Pahud and Jacky Terrasson (2003)
 Irreplaceable, George Benson (2004)
 The Ancient Art of Giving, Omer Avital (2006)
 Noir, Anat Cohen (2007)
 Live at Yoshi's (2010), Dee Dee Bridgewater
 Spirityouall, Bobby McFerrin (2013)
 53, Jacky Terrasson (2019)

References

External links
Official site

American jazz drummers
Cass Technical High School alumni
Living people
1976 births
Musicians from Detroit
Jazz musicians from Michigan
Jazz musicians from New York (state)
20th-century American drummers
American male drummers
21st-century American drummers
20th-century American male musicians
21st-century American male musicians
American male jazz musicians